Regeneration is an album by Stanley Cowell recorded in 1975 and first released on the Strata-East label.

Reception

In his review for AllMusic, Brian Olewnick states "Regeneration is an interesting, often enjoyable album which, aside from its own small pleasures, provides a snapshot of some of the cross-fertilization in genres occurring at the time".

Track listing
 "Trying to Find a Way" (Stanley Cowell, Viki-Maimoun McLaughlin) - 3:49		
 "The Gembhre" (Billy Higgins) - 4:30		
 "Shimmy Shewobble" (Marion Brown) - 4:00		
 "Parlour Blues" (Stanley Cowell, Aleke Kanonu) - 5:00		
 "Thank You My People" (Cowell, Kanonu) - 8:30		
 Travelin' Man" (Cowell, Curtis Fowlkes) - 4:00		
 "Lullabye" (Cowell, McLaughlin, Jerry Venable) - 5:45

Personnel
Stanley Cowell - piano, synthesizer, kora, mbira
Marion Brown - wooden flute (tracks 3 & 6) 
Jimmy Heath - soprano saxophone, flute, alto flute (tracks 5-7)
John Stubblefield - zurna (track 5)
Jerry Venable - acoustic guitar (track 1)
Psyche Wanzandae - harmonica, flute (tracks 4 & 5)
Bill Lee - bass (tracks 2, 6 & 7)
Aleke Kanonu - bass drum, vocals (tracks 1, 3 & 5)
Billy Higgins - drums, gembhre, percussion (tracks 1-3, 5 & 7)
Ed Blackwell - water drum, parade drum, percussion (tracks 1, 3 & 5)
Nadi Qamar - mama-lekimbe, percussion, Madigascan harp (tracks 2, 6 & 7)
Charles Fowlkes - vocals, electric bass (tracks 1, 5 7 6)
Glenda Barnes (track 1), Kareema (tracks 6 & 7) - vocals

References

1976 albums
Stanley Cowell albums
Strata-East Records albums